is a Japanese science fiction TV series inspired by the novel series of the same name, by American writer Edmond Hamilton. It was produced in 1978 by Tsuburaya Productions.

Series concept
The show is loosely based on the three books in the Star Wolf series by American science fiction novelist Edmond Hamilton: The Weapon from Beyond (published in 1967), The Closed Worlds and World of the Starwolves (both published in 1968). The name of the main character, an Earthman who was raised on the high gravity planet Varna and developed super-human strength and reflexes, was changed from Morgan Chane to Ken Shinsei. Starting with episode 14, the series was retitled Space Hero Star Wolf (宇宙の勇者 スターウルフ Uchû no Yûsha Sutâurufu).

American adaptation
The Japanese series was edited into two feature-length films for American television under the titles Fugitive Alien and Star Force: Fugitive Alien II. They were released directly to television by King Features Entertainment, the first film in 1986, running for 102 minutes, and the sequel in 1987, running for 75 minutes. Both films were featured on Season 3 of Mystery Science Theater 3000,  Fugitive Alien in episode 10, first shown on August 17, 1991, and Star Force: Fugitive Alien II in episode 18, first shown on November 16, 1991. Of note, both movies had also featured in the early KTMA era of MST3K, appearing out of order in episodes K12 and K03 respectively, before being revamped for the Comedy Channel era.

Cast
Source: 
Tatsuya Azuma, Joe Shishido, Miyuki Tanigawa, Chôei Takahashi, Tsutomu Yukawa, Hiro Tateyama, Akihiko Hirata

Staff 
Planning

 NOBORU & AKIRA TSUBURAYA, JUSHICHI SANO

Supervision

 HIDEO ITOKAWA

Created by

 EDMOND HAMILTON

Published in

 ACE BOOKS, HAYAKAWA BUNKO

Translation by

 MASAHIRO NODA

Producers

 KOZO KATO, MASUNOSUKE OHASHI, AKIRA TSUBURAYA, NORIKO SHISHIKURA

Screenplay

 KEIICHI ABE, BUNZO WAKATSUKI, HIROYASU YAMAURA, YOSHIHISA ARAKI, HIDEKA NAGASAKA, TOYOHIRO ANDO

Music

 NORIO MAEDA

VFX Director

 KAZUO SAGAWA

Directed by

 KIYOSUMI FUKASAWA, MINORU KANAYA
Also Starring

 YASUFUMI MORISAWA, KEIKO YAMAMOTO, YUKIHIRO ABO
 YUKO TAKAISHI, SHINYA KASHIMA, AYA ORIGUCHI
 MAYO SUZUKI, SABURO KADOWAKI 
 Dai Nagasawa, Makoto Ogami
 AKIHIKO HIRATA, MOJIJIRO SATO, EIICHI KIKUCHI
 KENJI TAMIYA, YUKIO TOYONAGA, KOICHI NARA
 TETSUO KUBOTA, MASAKI YAMANAKA 
 DAIGO KUSANO, KATSUNO UMINO, TETSUO TOMIKAWA
 HIROSHI OGASAWARA, SHOICHI SAWAMURA, JIICHI KITAMI
 MIKIO MURAKAMI, HIROKI ARASE
 KOSHIRO & TADAYOSHI TANAKA, HIROKO SAITO
 MIEI TACHIBANA, RYOJI NAKAMURA, GEN TAKASUGI
 SUSUKE IKEDA, YOSHIAKI WAKAO, YUZO OGURA
 JOE YAMAGUCHI, MITSUE NOMURA, TAKEO OGIWARA
 GOICHI NAGATANI, ISAMU ISHII, HIROYUKI INOZUKA
 NOBUYO OYAMA, AKIRA SAKAI
 TOMOKO ISHIKAWA, XIE YONG, HITOMI UMEMOTO
 CHIAKI SUMIYOSHI, KIYOMI OTSU, KAORU ICHINOSE
 TAKAO KOIKE, MITSUHIRO SANO  
 TAIKO RIN, NORIKO SHIRAISHI, YOICHIRO KITAGAWA
 TETSURO TSUNO, MASAYOSHI ANAHARA, ASAGIRI KAWAI 
 MICHIO KIDA, YOSHIAKI NAKABAYASHI
 KATSUSHI KURATOMI, SHINPEI ASANUMA
 MICHIYO HOZOIN, KOTARO TOMITA, ETSUKO UEKI
 YUJI YUSHIZAWA, TOYOJI SADA, JOJI ITO

Action Coordinators

 HIDENOBU OTSUKA, YASUAKI WATANABE, WORLD ACTION

Con 8's Voice

 KAZUE TAKAHASHI

Narrated by
 GORO NAYA

Staff 
Photography

 RYUKICHI MORI, GORO UCHIYAMA

Lighting

 KUNIO KISHIDA

Sound

 TAKESHI HONDA

SFX

 YOZO KATAOKA

Continuity

 NOBUE MIYAZAKI, SUMIKO FUJIWARA, KYOKO HIJIMI, MAYUMI ISHIYAMA

Assistant Directors

 KIYOHIKO MIYASAKA, TAKASHI KASAKURA

Production Designer

 OSAMU YAMAGUCHI

Special Effects Staff 

VFX Cameramen
 MITSUO FUSAMAE, JOE AIZAWA, SADAO SATO

Lighting

 FUMIYOSHI HARA

Continuity

 YOSHIKO HORI, SANAE KITAYAMA

Assistant Directors

 HISAO MARU, ISAO YOSHIHARA

Wire Operator

 KAME OGASAWARA

Art Designers

 OSAMU YAMAGUCHI, NAOTAKE SATSUMOTO, AKIHIKO IGUCHI, SHINICHI KANZAWA, SUMIO TAKIMOTO

Color Measurement

 ISAO KOJIMA, KENJI SUZUKI

Assistant Designer

 SUMIO TAKIMOTO

Makeup

 BEAUTY EYELIP, AIKO HIGASHISAKA & ISHIZUKA
Costumes
 TOHO COSTUMES, NAOMI NISHIYAMA

Editing by

 UME & MIKIO TAKEDA

Production Managers

 SATORU SAKAMOTO, YU IWATSUBO, MASAHIRO TANIGUCHI

Optical Photography

 TORU ISHIDA

Visual Effects

 MINORU NAKANO

In Charge of Production

 HIROSHI FUJIKURA

VFX Produced by

 DEN FILM EFFECTS

Recorded at

 CENTRAL SOUND

Film Processing by

 TOKYO LABORATORIES
UNIVAC by

 SPERRY Corporation

Special Thanks

 MIZUNO, MISAWA HOME, FUJI SPORTS

Practical Effects

 NUMARI PLANNING

Filming Co-operation

 YOKOHAMA DREAMLAND

Theme Songs

 "Youth Departure" 
 "Starwolf The Wanderer"

Lyrics by

 HARUO HAYASHI

Theme Music by

 KOICHI MORITA
 NORIO MAEDA

Performed by

 YUKI HIDE
 
A Production of
 TSUBURAYA PRODUCTIONS, YOMIURI TV

MST3K Host Segments & Audio Commentary (1991) 
Production Crew

 JIM MALLON, JOEL HODGSON, TRACE BEAULIEU, KEVIN MURPHY, MICHAEL J. NELSON, ALEXANDRA B. CARR, TIMOTHY SCOTT, JANN L. JOHNSON, JEF MAYNARD

Co-Written by

 FRANK CONNIFF, PAUL CHAPLIN

Contributing Writers

 BRIDGET JONES, PAUL CHAPLIN, COLEEN HENJUM

Manager of Business Affairs

 HEIDE LeCLERC

Post Production Facilities

 IVL POST

Video Provided by

 FOURNELLE PRODUCTION SERVICES

Audio by

 FRED STREET, BRIAN WRIGHT

Online Editors

 TIM PAULSON, KAREN LINDSAY

Lighting by

 KEN FOURNELLE

Hair and Makeup

 FAYE BURKHOLDER, CLAYTON JAMES

Special Makeup

 CRIST BALLAS, GLENN GRIFFIN

Interns

 THOMAS ALPHONSO, CYN ELLS, TOM HENDERSON, CHRISTOPHER WURST, CINDY HANSEN

Love Theme From MST3K

 THE BRAINS, CHARLIE ERICKSON

Mastered at

 BLUE LIGHT MUSIC

Special Thanks to

 BRYAN BEAULIEU, SKYLINE DISPLAYS, TEACHERS OF AMERICA, BILL W.

This Programme was Taped at

 BEST BRAINS STUDIOS

Filmed in

 SHADOWRAMA

Mystery Science Theater 3000 
 
 
 
 
 Episode guide: K12- Fugitive Alien
Episode guide: 310- Fugitive Alien
Episode guide: 318- Star Force: Fugitive Alien II

References

Footnotes

Sources

External links
 
 
 
 Japanese Wikipedia page relating to both the Edmond Hamilton series of books and the Japanese TV Series
  Five-minute preview of the first episode of Star Wolf on Veoh (video)
 Star Wolf opening sequence on Dailymotion (video)

1978 Japanese television series debuts
1978 Japanese television series endings
Japanese science fiction television series
Space adventure television series
Tokusatsu television series
Tsuburaya Productions
Yomiuri Telecasting Corporation original programming
Television shows based on American novels